The Girl Without a Conscience (German: Das Mädchen ohne Gewissen) is a 1922 German silent film directed by William Kahn and starring Maria Zelenka.

The film's art direction was by August Rinaldi.

Cast
In alphabetical order:
 Julius Falkenstein 
 Ernst Hofmann 
 Viggo Larsen 
 Sophie Pagay 
 Maria Zelenka

References

Bibliography
 Grange, William. Cultural Chronicle of the Weimar Republic. Scarecrow Press, 2008.

External links

1922 films
Films of the Weimar Republic
German silent feature films
Films directed by William Kahn
UFA GmbH films
German black-and-white films